Moreland Township may refer to the following townships in the United States:

 Moreland Township, Pope County, Arkansas
 Moreland Township, Lycoming County, Pennsylvania
 Moreland Township, Montgomery County, Pennsylvania
 Moreland Township, Philadelphia County, Pennsylvania

See also 
 Lower Moreland Township, Montgomery County, Pennsylvania
 Upper Moreland Township, Montgomery County, Pennsylvania